The flag of Navarre, the flag of the autonomous community of Navarre, was designed in 1910 by Arturo Campión, Julio Altadill, and Hermilio de Oloriz.  In 1910, the design was approved by the Provincial Council of Navarre and it was sanctioned by the Organic Law of Reintegration and Improvement of the Regional Government of Navarre (Ley Orgánica de Reintegración y Amejoramiento del Régimen Foral de Navarra, or LORAFNA) of August 10, 1982, which was established in Article 7.2: "The flag of Navarre is red-colored, with a shield in the center."

The shield is the coat of arms of Navarre, which consists of golden chains arranged against a red background, with an emerald in the center of the pattern linked to the eight chains, with a Royal Crown, a symbol of the ancient Kingdom of Navarre, added on top of the shield.

The flag of Navarre began to be used as a symbol for the region from 1910 onwards.  The color red was chosen for the flag because this was the color of the field of the coat of arms.

Previously, there had been no flag for Navarre per se, but just a royal standard for its monarchs.  This was a personal symbol of the king that he included with his coat of arms.  The first record of a red background for a flag dates from the 14th century, when the soldiers of King Charles II of Navarre, who intended to occupy Paris, wore distinctive berets of this color, according to
Martín Larrayoz.

Subsequently, Luis Correa, chronicler of the Duke of Alba during the conquest of Navarre in 1512, mentions a standard or ensign of the same red color when he mentions "in the forward lines three hundred men-at-arms on foot with a banner colored red with certain stripes of gold on it that they all guarded and swore to never surrender."

Official flags

Historical models

Variant flag

See also 
 Coat of arms of Navarre

References

External links 
 Ley Foral 24/2003, de 4 de abril, de Símbolos de Navarra.
  Descripción de la bandera ofrecida por el Gobierno de Navarra
 Nafarroako Erresuma
 El régimen jurídico de los símbolos de Navarra; Miguel José Izu Belloso; Instituto Navarro de Administración Pública, Pamplona, 2011.

Flags of Spain
Navarre
Navarre
Flags introduced in 1982